This list of mines in California is subsidiary to the list of mines article and lists working, defunct and future mines in the state and is organised by the primary mineral output. For practical purposes stone, marble and other quarries may be included in this list.

Gold

Silver
Waterloo mine

References

 List
California
Mines